PC Plus was a computer magazine published monthly from 1986  until September 2012 in the UK by Future plc. The magazine was aimed at intermediate to advanced PC users, computer professionals and enthusiasts.  The magazine was specifically for users of PCs and related technologies so features articles were undiluted by coverage of other platforms. It began its life specifically as a magazine aimed at the Amstrad PC user.

Staff 
For many years, the editor (later editor-in-chief) was Dave Pearman.  PC Plus print magazine was closed in October 2012, when the editor was Martin Cooper.

Each edition of the print magazine was centered on four main sections - news, reviews, features, and tutorials.

Under Pearman's editorship, the magazine was characterised by the inclusion of irreverent off-the-wall features and content including Huw Collingbourne's Rants and Raves, a serialisation of a fictional office entitled Group Efforts and the Bastard Operator From Hell. The magazine frequently drew on images of Bath, its office base, during multimedia tutorial articles.

Future plc. no longer publishes PC Plus as a print publication although the on-line domain is still serviced by parent brand TechRadar.com.

References

External links
 PC Plus Official website (archived copy in the Wayback Machine)

1986 establishments in the United Kingdom
2012 disestablishments in the United Kingdom
Monthly magazines published in the United Kingdom
Defunct computer magazines published in the United Kingdom
Home computer magazines
Magazines established in 1986
Magazines disestablished in 2012